The Bahamas Plastic Movement is a Nonprofit organization based out of the South Eleuthera, Bahamas that focuses on reducing plastic pollution. The organization was founded in 2014 by Kristal Ambrose. The organization specializes in using youth to end plastic pollution. They are an active member of the Plastic Pollution Coalition.

In 2017, the Bahamas Plastic Movement helped create Jack Johnson's music video for "You Can't Control It," and the cover for his album All the Light Above It Too.

Plastic bag ban 
In 2018 a youth delegation from the Bahamas Plastic Movement traveled to Nassau, Bahamas to meet with Romauld Ferreira, Minister of the Environment and Housing, to ban plastic bags in the Bahamas. The Bahamas Plastic Movement claimed that if plastic pollution on beaches increased that $8.5 million in tourism would be lost. Fereira and his cabinet have since approved plans to phase out plastic bags by 2020.

References 

Non-profit organisations based in the Bahamas
Ocean pollution
Eleuthera
Organizations established in 2014
2014 establishments in the Bahamas